Mount Sunapee (or Sunapee Mountain on federal maps) is a  mountain ridge in the towns of Newbury and Goshen in western New Hampshire, United States. The north end of the mountain, including the summit, is within Mount Sunapee State Park, which encompasses  and is home to the popular Mount Sunapee Resort. The mountain extends south to Pillsbury State Park in the towns of Goshen and Washington.

The entire mountain ridge is traversed by the Monadnock-Sunapee Greenway, a hiking trail that links the summit of Sunapee with that of Mount Monadnock,  to the south in the town of Jaffrey, New Hampshire. Also crossing the summit in an east–west route is a section of the Sunapee-Ragged-Kearsarge Greenway, a  trail linking ten towns in west-central New Hampshire as it circles the Lake Sunapee region and crosses the summits of the three mountains for which it is named. The two Greenway trails meet at Lake Solitude and use the same trail to the summit.

Hydrology 

The ridgeline of Sunapee Mountain forms the divide between the Merrimack River and Connecticut River watersheds. The lake flows into Andrew Brook, a tributary of the Warner River in the Merrimack River watershed. Farther south along the ridge, the east slopes of the mountain drain via the West Branch of the Warner River into the Warner and Merrimack rivers.

The northern and western sides of the mountain drain to the Connecticut River. Johnson Brook flows down the north slopes of the mountain, entering Lake Sunapee, the outlet of which (the Sugar River) flows west to the Connecticut in Claremont. On the western slopes of the mountain, Gunnison Brook, Blood Brook, and Baker Brook flow to the South Branch of the Sugar River. The southwestern end of the mountain drains via Cherry Brook into the headwaters of the Ashuelot River, which reaches the Connecticut River near the Massachusetts border.

Recreation 

Snow skiing and snowboard riding are popular winter activities at Mount Sunapee Resort & Ski Area. The ski area lies within Mount Sunapee State Park, but in 1998 the state leased the  ski area of the park to be operated by Tim and Dianne Mueller, who own Okemo Mountain Resort. In 2018 the operations contract was bought by Vail Resorts.

The state park's extensive trail system is used in all seasons for hiking and in winter for snowshoeing. The park is linked to Pillsbury State Park  and southern New Hampshire by the  Monadnock-Sunapee Greenway and to the ten-town Lake Sunapee region by the  "emerald necklace" of the Sunapee-Ragged-Kearsarge (SRK) Greenway which connects Mt. Sunapee to Wadleigh State Park in Sutton and to Winslow and Rollins State Parks on Mount Kearsarge in Warner and Wilmot. From the ski area parking, the Summit Trail travels  along the western slope to the summit, where it meets the Solitude Trail for a  walk to Lake Solitude and White Ledges. The Solitude Trail then links to several trails, notably the popular Andrew Brook Trail and the steeper Newbury Trail, both heading eastward, and to the M-S Greenway as it heads south along Sunapee Mountain toward Pillsbury State Park.

Climate

According to the Köppen Climate Classification system, Mount Sunapee has a warm-summer humid continental climate, abbreviated "Dfb" on climate maps.

References

External links 
 Mount Sunapee State Park
 Sunapee-Ragged-Kearsarge Greenway Coalition

Sunapee, Mount
Sunapee, Mount
Sunapee, Mount
Sunapee, Mount
Tourist attractions in Merrimack County, New Hampshire
Tourist attractions in Sullivan County, New Hampshire
Newbury, New Hampshire
Goshen, New Hampshire